Thunderbyrd is American singer-songwriter and guitarist Roger McGuinn's 5th solo studio album, released in 1977 on the Columbia Records label. Following the success of his 1976 album Cardiff Rose, McGuinn intended to make another album in collaboration with its producer Mick Ronson. This project however never materialized. Instead he put together a new band, Thunderbyrd, and recorded this album with them.

The album contains four original compositions by McGuinn and his old songwriting collaborator Jacques Levy. It also includes a version of Tom Petty's "American Girl", originally a hit the year before from Tom Petty and the Heartbreakers's eponymous debut album.

Thunderbyrd was not well received by critics or record buyers and was to be McGuinn's last solo album until 1991's Back from Rio.

Track listing

 "All Night Long" (Peter Frampton, Mick Gallagher) – 4:19
 "It's Gone" (Jacques Levy, Roger McGuinn) – 3:57
 "Dixie Highway" (Levy, McGuinn) – 3:29
 "American Girl" (Tom Petty) – 4:30
 "We Can Do It All Over Again" (Barry Goldberg, Mentor Williams) – 4:44
 "Why Baby Why" (Darrell Edwards, George Jones) – 3:48
 "I'm Not Lonely Anymore" (Levy, McGuinn) – 3:07
 "Golden Loom" (Bob Dylan) – 4:07
 "Russian Hill" (Levy, McGuinn) – 5:03

Personnel
Roger McGuinn – vocals, guitar
Rick Vito – guitars, vocals, dobro, harmonica
Charlie Harrison – bass, vocals
Greg Thomas – drums, percussion
with:
Marty Grebb – keyboards
Tom Scott – saxophone solo on "American Girl"
Janis Oliver-Gill, Kristine Oliver-Arnold, Jennifer O'Neill – backing vocals on "We Can Do It All Over Again"
Bruce Barlow – bass on "It's Gone" and "Russian Hill"
Steve Forman – percussion on "Russian Hill"

Notes

Roger McGuinn albums
1977 albums
Albums produced by Don DeVito
Columbia Records albums